Felipe José Abárzuza y Oliva (24 May 1896 – 27 August 1970) was a Spanish admiral who served as Minister of the Navy of Spain between 1957 and 1962, during the Francoist dictatorship.

References

1896 births
1970 deaths
Defence ministers of Spain
Government ministers during the Francoist dictatorship